Cecil Dale Andrus (August 25, 1931 – August 24, 2017) was an American politician who served 26th and 28th governor of Idaho, for total of fourteen years. A Democrat, he also served as U.S. Secretary of the Interior from 1977 to 1981 during the Carter Administration. Andrus lost his first gubernatorial election in 1966, but won four (in 1970, 1974, 1986, and 1990) and his 14 years as governor is the most in state history. He is the most recent Democrat to have held the office.

In public life, Andrus was noted for his strong conservationist and environmental views and accomplishments, and an Idaho wildlife preserve established in 1993 in Washington County is named the Cecil D. Andrus Wildlife Management Area in his honor. In 2018, the Cecil D. Andrus–White Clouds Wilderness was renamed after him. A political liberal, he protected the environment by minimizing the control of business interests held over the public domain and by concentrating decision-making in the hands of experts in the Interior Department. He argued that environmentalism can and must coexist with positive economic development.

Early life
Born in Hood River, Oregon on August 25, 1931, Andrus was the middle of three children of Hal Stephen and Dorothy May (Johnson) Andrus, with older brother Steve and younger sister Margaret. They later lived near Junction City, on a farm without electricity. During World War II, the family moved to Eugene in early 1942, when "Cece" was 11, where Hal (1906–2004) and his brother Bud opened a machine shop to refurbish sawmill equipment. Andrus graduated from Eugene High School in 1948 at age 16 and attended Oregon State College in Corvallis, where he majored in engineering in his freshman year.

At age 17, he got a good summer job with the local utility in 1949, and late in August, he eloped to Reno with Carol Mae May (born December 26, 1932), his high school sweetheart. Andrus had just turned 18, and she was 16 months younger. The Andruses enjoyed a happy, affectionate marriage, and he always referred to her as "his first wife" or "his bride". He decided to keep working and not return to college. Following the outbreak of the Korean War, he enlisted in the U.S. Naval Reserves in February 1951, and served as an electronics technician aboard patrol aircraft until 1955. After his discharge from the Navy, Andrus moved to Orofino, where he worked in the timber industry in a variety of jobs at a sawmill his father co-owned. After the sawmill closed, Andrus switched to the insurance industry in 1963, and moved his family down the Clearwater River to Lewiston in 1966.

Political career

State Senate
In 1960, at age 28, and concerned over the local Republican state senator's stance against needed education improvements in Idaho schools, particularly in rural areas of the state, Andrus filed as a Democrat to run against him and won, and was re-elected in 1962 and 1964 from Orofino (and Clearwater County).

Gubernatorial candidate
Andrus first ran for governor in 1966, but was narrowly defeated in the Democratic primary by Charles Herndon, an attorney from Salmon.

Andrus was appointed the nominee to take Herndon's place on the ballot. He lost the general election to Republican Don Samuelson of Sandpoint by more than 11,000 votes, earning Andrus the unlikely distinction of losing both the primary and general election races for the same office in the same year.

Governor of Idaho (1971–77)
Undaunted by his earlier setback, Andrus defeated Samuelson by over 10,000 votes in a gubernatorial election rematch in 1970. This was attributed in large part to Andrus's public opposition to proposals for development of molybdenum mining in central Idaho's White Cloud Mountains, which Samuelson supported.

During his first term as governor, Andrus played a key role in winning support by the U.S. Congress for federal designation of the Sawtooth Wilderness Area in the State of Idaho. Andrus was easily re-elected in 1974 with over 70% of the vote, defeating Republican Lieutenant Governor Jack M. Murphy of Shoshone by a record margin.

In 1974, Time magazine named Governor Andrus one of the "200 Faces for the Future".

Secretary of the Interior (1977–81)
In January 1977, Andrus left his post as governor to serve as Secretary of the Interior for newly inaugurated President Jimmy Carter, whom he had known since both were freshman governors in 1971. Andrus became the first Idahoan to serve in a Presidential Cabinet. He was succeeded in Idaho by Lieutenant Governor John V. Evans, a Democrat who served nearly a decade, winning re-election in 1978 and in 1982.

Andrus also took a leadership role in securing Congressional passage of the Redwood National Park Expansion Act in 1978. which added  to Redwood National Park in California, in a major expansion to preserve remnants of the giant redwood forests there.

In 1979, when President Carter asked for the resignations of his entire Cabinet during an administration retreat at Camp David, the resignation of Andrus was not accepted. Andrus stayed on as Secretary of the Interior for the remainder of Carter's presidency, and returned to Idaho after Carter's term ended in January 1981.

Andrus wrote in his memoir about such a need for compromise relative to his successful, last-ditch efforts in securing passage of the Alaska Lands Act during the last month of the Carter Administration in December 1980, following Ronald Reagan's election in November: "The environmental groups were initially hostile. I actually had to listen to the idiotic argument (from the Wilderness Society and Sierra Club's paid Washington lobbyists) that they could get a better Alaska package out of Reagan and Watt."

"Cooler heads quickly prevailed", Andrus continues, "It proved the old adage that there's nothing like a hanging in the morning to focus the mind. Even though we were creating tomorrow's controversies, a 103-million acre [preservation] plan ... was a lot better than nothing."

Governor of Idaho again (1987–95)
After several years in private life following his return to Idaho in 1981, Andrus surprised many by seeking and recapturing the Idaho governorship in 1986, when he defeated Republican Lieutenant Governor David Leroy in a close open seat election. The incumbent since succeeding Andrus in 1977, Evans had chosen to run for the U.S. Senate, but lost.

During this second stint as governor, Andrus vigorously opposed federal efforts to store nuclear waste in Idaho. He also brokered a path-breaking agreement among land use and conservation interests to control water pollution from nonpoint sources to protect riparian and fish habitat in Idaho's rivers and streams.

In September 1989, Andrus closed off the Idaho border to nuclear waste shipments from the federal government's Rocky Flats site near Denver. He initially agreed to open a temporary dump near Idaho Falls to store waste until the federal government agreed to open a site near Carlsbad, New Mexico. When the federal government failed to open the Carlsbad site, Andrus refused to accept shipments of plutonium from Rocky Flats. Secretary of Energy James D. Watkins did not challenge Andrus's authority to close the border.

In 1990, Andrus drew attention when he vetoed a bill, passed by the legislature, which "would have made abortion illegal except in cases of non-statutory rape reported within seven days, incest if the victim was under 18, severe fetal deformity or where the pregnancy posed a threat to the mother's life." Andrus was easily re-elected later that year against conservative Republican state senator Roger Fairchild of Fruitland, and won every county except Lemhi and Jefferson.

In his fourth and final term as governor, Andrus was again in the national spotlight due to the Endangered Species Act listing of several Snake River salmon species.  These anadromous fish species spawn in their natal streams in Idaho and migrate seaward at a young age. Governor Andrus called attention to the downstream federal dams operated by the Army Corps of Engineers as the major culprit. His successful lawsuit against the federal government led to incremental changes in operations of the dams, and to continuing efforts for major conservationist modifications to the dams that are ongoing today.

On April 3, 1990, he signed House Bill 817 into law, creating two new types of felony crimes, defined new criminal investigation areas, provided the basis for opening ritual child abuse cases based upon probable cause, and provided a framework for extensive ritual child abuse investigation training throughout Idaho.

Despite remaining personally popular, Andrus did not seek a fifth term in 1994. At his death in 2017, he was the eleventh longest-serving governor in  Andrus was succeeded by Phil Batt of Wilder, the first Republican to win a gubernatorial election in Idaho since 1966; he served a single term and did not seek a second in 1998. Andrus's re-election in 1990 was the sixth straight gubernatorial win by Democrats in Idaho (Evans in 1978, 1982), but is the most recent; Republicans have since won seven consecutive,

Election results

Elder statesman

A wildlife preservation area in Idaho established in 1993,  from Cambridge in Washington County, is named the Cecil D. Andrus Wildlife Management Area in his honor.

In 1995, Andrus founded the Andrus Center for Public Policy at Boise State University, and in 1998, published his memoir, Politics Western Style.

An elementary school opened in 1997 in west Boise by the West Ada School District was named the Cecil D. Andrus Elementary School in his honor.

Andrus remained active in the Idaho Democratic Party in the early 21st Century, and continued to campaign on behalf of other Democrats. In 2006, Andrus served as campaign treasurer for Idaho Democratic gubernatorial nominee Jerry Brady. In February 2008, Andrus endorsed and campaigned actively on behalf of Illinois Senator Barack Obama in Boise.

At what was described as the "second biggest political rally in Idaho history", by The New York Times, Andrus introduced Obama and recalled hearing John F. Kennedy speak years earlier: "I'm older now, some would suggest in the twilight of a mediocre political career", Andrus said, "[but] I, like you, can still be inspired. I can still hope."

In the closing page of his memoir, Andrus quotes the poet Robert Frost: "We should not have to care so much, you and I."  "But we do care", Andrus continues, "and we should.  We care about the future ... I remain hopeful that I will be able to pass on to my grandchildren all the pleasures of life in an unspoiled West.  Perhaps hope should be replaced by a stronger word. It is a matter of obligation."

A 2011 book on Andrus and his career in public service described him as "Idaho's greatest governor".

Death
Andrus died on August 24, 2017, in Boise, just one day before his 86th birthday, of complications from lung cancer.

References

Bibliography
 Andrus, Cecil D., with Joel Connelly, Politics Western Style, Sasquatch Books, Seattle, 1998; 
 Becher, Anne, and Joseph Richey, American Environmental Leaders: From Colonial Times to the Present (2 vol, 2nd ed. 2008) vol 1 online pp. 27–29.
 Carlson, Chris - Cecil Andrus: Idaho's Greatest Governor, Caxton Press, October 2011;

External links

 
 

|-

|-

|-

|-

|-

1931 births
2017 deaths
20th-century American politicians
American Lutherans
Carter administration cabinet members
Deaths from lung cancer in Idaho
Democratic Party governors of Idaho
Democratic Party Idaho state senators
Military personnel from Oregon
Oregon State University alumni
Politicians from Eugene, Oregon
People from Hood River, Oregon
People from Lewiston, Idaho
People from Orofino, Idaho
South Eugene High School alumni
United States Secretaries of the Interior
Writers from Idaho
Writers from Oregon
United States Navy personnel of the Korean War
United States Navy non-commissioned officers
United States Navy reservists